QLS may refer to:
 QLS connector
 Dynamic light scattering, also known as quasi-elastic light scattering, a technique in physics